Gustav Adolf Merkel (November 12, 1827, Oberoderwitz, Kingdom of Saxony – October 30, 1885, Dresden) was a German organist and composer.

Having been given some lessons by Schumann in his youth, Merkel spent most of his career in Dresden, concentrating on organ-playing from 1858. A Lutheran himself, he nevertheless held an appointment at the Catholic Church of the Court of Saxony from 1864 until his death. During the same period he taught the organ at Dresden's Conservatory.

His compositions include nine organ sonatas (which have been recorded several times, as well as occurring quite often in organ recitals), of which the first sonata (Op.30) is written for two organists, and several dozen miniatures (some of them based on Protestant chorale melodies). In these works, his style is broadly conservative, very much influenced by Mendelssohn, and with similarities to the output of his younger contemporary Josef Rheinberger. He also produced choral and piano pieces; his salon piece "Schmetterling" ("Butterfly"), Op. 81, No. 4 is particularly well-known.

Further reading
 Paul Janssen, Gustav Merkel: Ein Bild seines Lebens und Wirkens (Leipzig, 1886).
 Magdalene Saal, Gustav Adolf Merkel: Leben und Orgelwerk (Frankfurt, 1993).

External links

1827 births
1885 deaths
19th-century classical composers
19th-century German composers
19th-century German male musicians
German Romantic composers
German male classical composers
German classical organists
German male organists
People from Görlitz (district)
People from the Kingdom of Saxony
Pupils of Friedrich Wieck
Male classical organists
19th-century organists